Mohd Halim Napi is a Malaysian former footballer who played as goalkeeper for Kelantan, Negeri Sembilan and Kelantan JKR. Halim was a versatile footballer. After retiring from Kelantan he became a goalkeeper coach for Kelantan FA U21 team.

Halim spent most of his career with Kelantan. In June 1994, he was suspended for the rest of the season because of a fight during a match against Selangor. He moved to Negeri Sembilan in 1995 and then joined Perak in 1996, playing with the club for the season. In August 1997, Halim was suspended, at first for life, by the Football Association of Malaysia for an incident with a referee; the ban was later reduced to one year on appeal. Upon the end of his suspension in 1998, Halim returned to the Kelantan net and earned recognition from the league's coaches for his strong performance.

Halim was suspended again in 2009, this time after he was accused of kicking and punching Negeri Sembilan's Aidil Zafuan following a cup match.

Honours

Clubs
Kelantan
 Malaysia FAM Cup: 2005
 Malaysia Premier League: Promotion 2007–08
 Malaysia Cup: Runner-up 2009

References

1971 births
Living people
Malaysian footballers
Association football goalkeepers
Kelantan FA players
People from Kelantan
Malaysian people of Malay descent